Anisophyllea penninervata is a tree species in the family Anisophylleaceae, with no subspecies listed in the Catalogue of Life.  It has only been recorded from southern Vietnam where it may be called bất đẳng diệp.

References

External links 
 

 
Anisophylleaceae
Flora of Indo-China
Trees of Vietnam